Massachusetts House of Representatives' 8th Worcester district in the United States is one of 160 legislative districts included in the lower house of the Massachusetts General Court. It covers parts of Norfolk County and Worcester County. Republican Mike Soter of Bellingham has represented the district since 2019.

Towns represented
The district includes the following localities:
 Bellingham
 Blackstone
 Millville
 Uxbridge

The current district geographic boundary overlaps with that of the Massachusetts Senate's Worcester and Norfolk district.

Former locales
The district previously covered:
 Boylston, circa 1872 
 Sterling, circa 1872 
 West Boylston, circa 1872

Representatives
 Horace Faulkner, circa 1858 
 John M. Washburn, circa 1859 
 John J. Allen, circa 1888 
 Samuel V. Crane, circa 1920 
 Peter F. Fitzgerald, circa 1951 
 Charles A. Mullaly, Jr., circa 1951 
 Richard James Dwinell, circa 1975 
 Kevin Kuros, 2011–2018 
 Michael J. Soter, 2019-current

See also
 List of Massachusetts House of Representatives elections
 Other Worcester County districts of the Massachusetts House of Representatives: 1st, 2nd, 3rd, 4th, 5th, 6th, 7th, 9th, 10th, 11th, 12th, 13th, 14th, 15th, 16th, 17th, 18th
 Worcester County districts of the Massachusett Senate: 1st, 2nd; Hampshire, Franklin and Worcester; Middlesex and Worcester; Worcester, Hampden, Hampshire and Middlesex; Worcester and Middlesex; Worcester and Norfolk
 List of Massachusetts General Courts
 List of former districts of the Massachusetts House of Representatives

Images
Portraits of legislators

References

External links
 Ballotpedia
  (State House district information based on U.S. Census Bureau's American Community Survey).

House
Government in Worcester County, Massachusetts
Government of Norfolk County, Massachusetts